Say You're One of Them  is a collection of short stories by Nigerian writer Uwem Akpan, first published in 2008. Containing five stories, each set in a different African country. This collection won the 2009 Commonwealth Writers Prize (Africa region) and the 2009 Beyond Margins Award.

Stories
"An Ex-Mas Feast": is told from the viewpoint of a young boy living in a Nairobi slum. The boy is given glue to sniff by his mother to quell his hunger, while his 12-year-old sister works as a prostitute and contemplates deserting her desperate failing family.
"Fattening for Gabon": is a novella set in a small sea-side town on the outskirts of Lagos, near the border between Nigeria and Benin. It is about a 10-year-old boy (who narrates) and his younger sister whose parents have died of AIDS. Initially glad to be taken in by their uncle, the boy slowly begins to realize that he and his sister are to be sold into slavery. With the payment for them, a new motorbike, already having been delivered, the deal cannot be cancelled.
"My Parents' Bedroom": is set in Rwanda and again written in the first person, tells of a young girl with some neighbours hiding in the ceiling of her parents' room while other adults of her hometown, neighbours and strangers alike, take part in a brutal killing spree. 
"Luxurious Hearses": another novella, it tells the story of a Muslim boy in Nigeria, disguised as a Christian, attempting to make his way to a safe area in the midst of mass religious riots between the two faiths.
"What Language is That?": is about two young girls in Ethiopia, one Christian, one Muslim, who are forced to break their friendship as religious tensions explode in their community.

Awards and honours
2008 Guardian First Book Award longlist
2008 Los Angeles Times Book Prize finalist (Art Seidenbaum Award for First Fiction)
2009 Oprah's Book Club selection
2009 Commonwealth Writers' Prize (Best First Book, Africa)
2009 Beyond Margins Award
2009 Hurston/Wright Legacy Award (Fiction)
2009 Dayton Literary Peace Prize Runner-Up

References

2008 short story collections
Nigerian short story collections
Abacus books